Chalampé is a commune in the Haut-Rhin department in Alsace in north-eastern France, just across the river Rhine from Neuenburg, Germany.

The town was founded by soldiers of Marshal Dubourg who in 1709 had beaten the Austrians under Count Claude Florimond de Mercy in the War of the Spanish Succession. It is located in an area called Eichwald (oak forest) by the otherwise German-speaking population of the Alsace, and bears its French name since 1735. Before Johann Gottfried Tulla and others straightened the Rhine in the 19th century, the river had changed its course several times, moving the border. Thus, the village was sometimes considered to be part of Germany.

See also
 Communes of the Haut-Rhin department

References

External links
Official website

Communes of Haut-Rhin